Bhola Island (also called Dakhin Shahbazpur) is the largest island of Bangladesh with an area of 1,441 km2. It is most of the land area of Bhola District in Barisal Division.

Geography

It is situated at the mouth of the Meghna River. There are ferry and launch services from Dhaka and Barisal.

A 1776 map indicates that it was oval-shaped yet it is currently more elongated because of erosion by the Meghna River.

Due to its low elevation, large parts of the island have already been inundated by sea level rise, and the island is at serious risk of disappearing entirely.

Culture
According to the 2011 census, 96.7% are Muslim, 3.3% are Hindu.

Bhola Island is known for its Buffalo curd (doi) which is unique in Bangladesh. The process that has been used has remained unchanged. It is made in traditional clay pots and the process takes 18 hours. It is popular in the Island and is served in special occasions such as weddings, festivals and other special occasions.

Energy
The Island has faced chronic power issues, although natural gas was discovered in Shahbazpur in 1994. The government decided to build a power plant which is expected to fully operational by August 2015. The state-owned Power Grid Company of Bangladesh (PGCB) is installing a high voltage transmission line from Bhola Island to Borhanuddin Island.

Media
There are 14 community radio stations on air.

History
In 1970 it was affected by the devastating Bhola Cyclone which completely devastated the southern half of the island and also destroyed the rice crop.

In October 1975, it was home to the last human being naturally infected with smallpox.  When a toddler named Rahima Banu became infected with the virus, the World Health Organization sent a team to vaccinate 18,150 individuals who lived within a 1.5-mile radius of her home, which prevented the spread of the virus and eliminated it.

In 1995, half of the island became flooded, leaving 500,000 people homeless.

In 2005, floods affected over half a million people on the island. Significant floods in the months and years before had caused severe erosion and led to a number of rivers overflowing. As of 2009 a number of the island's inhabitants were living in the slums of Dhaka.

In 2019, riots erupted after a Hindu man from the island was accused of posting blasphemous content against the Prophet Muhammad. It was later discovered his account had been hacked to say such things by mischief makers wanting money.

See also
 List of islands of Bangladesh

References

Bhola District
Islands of Bangladesh
Islands of the Bay of Bengal
Populated places in Bangladesh